Roc, ROC, or R.O.C. may refer to:

People
Roch (c. 1348 – 1376), Occitan saint called Roc in Catalan
Agustí Roc (born 1971), Spanish ski mountaineer
Margaret Roc (born 1945), Australian author
Patricia Roc (1915–2003), British actress
Ste V Roc (born 1977), Irish hip-hop artist
Roc Alexander (born 1981), American football player
Roche Braziliano (fl. 1630–1671), also spelled Roc, Dutch pirate
Roc Kirby (1918–2008), Australian businessman
Roc Oliva (born 1989), Spanish field hockey player
Roc Raida (1972–2009), American disc jockey, turntablist and producer
Roc Thomas (born 1995), American football player
The R.O.C. (rapper) (born 1973), American rapper

Places
Republic of China, the official name of Taiwan
Republic of China (1912–1949), the internationally recognized government of China prior to the retreat of the Kuomintang to Taiwan and the establishment of the People's Republic of China by the Chinese Communist Party
Republic of the Congo, the official name of a Central African country
Republic of Cyprus, the official name of Cyprus
Rest of Canada, term for everywhere in Canada outside Quebec
Roč, a town in Croatia
Le Roc, a commune in France
Ross and Cromarty, registration county in Scotland, Chapman code
Republic of Crimea, a disputed Russian republic
Republic of Cuba, the official name of Cuba

Companies and organizations
Radar Operations Center, US National Weather Service unit
Regional Organisations of Councils, voluntary groupings of neighbouring councils in Australia
Registrar of Companies, India
Remote Operations Center, a National Security Agency facility in Fort Meade, Maryland
Restaurant Opportunities Center, a union-supported labor group
Resuscitation Outcomes Consortium, a network of clinical trial sites
Right of Centre, a short-lived New Zealand political party
Roc Books, a paperback science fiction and fantasy imprint of Penguin Group
Roc Nation, an American entertainment company
Roc Oil Company, based in Sydney, Australia
Royal Observer Corps, a former British civil defence organisation
Romanian Orthodox Church
Russian Orthodox Church

Entertainment
R.O.C. (band), British electronica group founded in 1983 by Fred Browning and Patrick Nicholson
Roc (Dungeons & Dragons), a role-playing version of the mythical bird
"Roc" (Nâdiya song), 2006
Roc (The-Dream song)
Roc (TV series), an American sitcom which aired 1991–94

Finance
Rate of change (technical analysis)
Return on capital

Mathematics
Radius of curvature (optics)
Receiver operating characteristic, ROC curve (statistics)
Radius of convergence

Transport and vehicles
Rail operating centre, a type of railway signalling centre in the UK
Greater Rochester International Airport (IATA airport code ROC), Rochester, Monroe County, New York State, USA
Roche railway station (station code ROC), Roche, Cornwall, England, UK
"Roc" (N351SL), the first (and only) Scaled Composites Stratolaunch (Model 351), an aircraft designed to carry air-launch-to-orbit rockets
Blackburn Roc, a British naval fighter-bomber and turret fighter aircraft of World War II

Sports
 Russian Olympic Committee
 ROC, the IOC code used for Russian Olympic Committee athletes:
 Russian Olympic Committee athletes at the 2020 Summer Olympics
 Russian Olympic Committee athletes at the 2022 Winter Olympics
 Race of Champions (disambiguation)
 Race of Champions, motorsport event combining track and rally drivers
 Race of Champions (modified racing), a yearly stock car race using modified race cars
 Roc, the name of the University of Pittsburgh's costumed panther mascot (see Panthers of Pittsburgh)
 ROC, the IOC code formerly used for Republic of China at the Olympics 1924–1948

Other uses
Roglai language (ISO 639 language code roc)
Renewables Obligation certificates, used in the UK's electricity supply industry
Republic of Chocolate
Resource-oriented computing
Roc (mythology), a mythical giant bird

See also

Roc-A-Fella Records, known as "The Roc"
Rock (disambiguation)
ROCS (disambiguation)
Rok (disambiguation)
Roque (disambiguation)